Hans Krausner is an Austrian luger who competed in the 1950s. He won a gold medal in the men's doubles event at the inaugural FIL World Luge Championships in Oslo in 1955.

Krausner also won five medals at the European luge championships with two golds (Men's doubles: 1951, 1953), two silvers (Men's singles: 1956, Men's doubles: 1952), and one bronze (1954).

References

Austrian male lugers
Possibly living people
Year of birth missing